Silver & Black is the third studio album released by rap group, Luniz, released on August 13, 2002. It is their fourth album overall. It peaked at #53 on the Billboard Top R&B/Hip hop Albums chart.

Track listing

Production
 Executive producer: J Prince
 Produced by Wolverine, Mr Lee, Felli Fell, Mark Murray, [Mo' Betta & Edwin Delahoz], The Platinum Bros and LT Hutton

References

2002 albums
Luniz albums
Albums produced by L.T. Hutton
Rap-A-Lot Records albums
Virgin Records albums
Asylum Records albums